Simanga Shiba (born 5 December 1987) is an amateur boxer from Swaziland who won a Bronze at the Commonwealth Games 2006 at junior flyweight.

Shiba beat Cassius Chiyanika of Zambia and Patrick Barnes of Northern Ireland but lost to eventual winner Japhet Uutoni of Namibia in the 2006 Commonwealth Games semifinal.

At the 2007 World Championships he missed his opening bout against Luis Yanez who won by walkover.

At the 1st Olympic qualifier for 2008 he lost to Suleiman Bilali but received a wildcard by the AIBA. However, Shiba did not compete in Beijing.

External links
Qualifier
Bio

1987 births
Living people
Light-flyweight boxers
Swazi male boxers
Boxers at the 2006 Commonwealth Games
Commonwealth Games bronze medallists for Eswatini
Commonwealth Games medallists in boxing
Medallists at the 2006 Commonwealth Games